Statistics of the Scottish Football League in season 1967–68.

Scottish League Division One

Scottish League Division Two

See also
1967–68 in Scottish football

References

 
Scottish Football League seasons